The University of New York in Prague (UNYP) is a private higher education institution in Prague, Czech Republic.  It was established in 1998 in cooperation with the State University of New York at New Paltz and Empire State College, both part of the State University of New York (SUNY). UNYP was recognized by the Czech Ministry of Education, Youth and Sports in 2001 on the basis of accreditation of its study programs in Business Administration and International European Relations. UNYP is a member of the British Accreditation Council for Independent Further and Higher Education.

Originally located in the historic old town of Prague, on the corner of Mikovcova and Legerova streets, in 2014 UNYP moved to a new campus on Londýnská 41 in Vinohrady (Prague 2).

Academics
UNYP offers accredited bachelor's degrees, Master's programs, MBA programs, and PhD programs in English, in partnership with universities in the United States and across Europe. More than 60% of faculty members hold doctoral degrees. These doctorates are most frequently from Charles University or the Prague University of Economics.

Undergraduate programs
The university awards four-year American bachelor's degrees in the fields of Business Administration (dual degree), International Relations (dual degree), Communication and Media (dual degree), Child Development, Psychology (dual degree), Digital Media Arts, English Language and Literature, Information Technology, and Political Science. These courses are offered in cooperation with the State University of New York, Empire State College and recognized and accredited by the Czech Ministry of Education as well by the US Middle States Association of Colleges and Schools.

The university also awards three-year European bachelor's degrees in the field of Business Administration with concentrations in Marketing, Human Resources, Sports Management, or Finance. European bachelor's degrees are recognized and accredited by the Czech Ministry of Education as well as the International Assembly for Collegiate Business Education (IACBE).

Graduate programs

Master's Degrees offered by UNYP include an MA in Psychology. UNYP also offers MBA programs focused on Marketing, Finance, Management, Entrepreneurship, or Global Business Services. The UNYP MBA is an IACBE-accredited program.

Doctorates

PhDs are awarded by UNYP in cooperation with the University of Bolton in the United Kingdom.

Accreditation
UNYP has been a part of the higher education system of the Czech Republic since 2001, when it was recognized by the Czech Ministry of Education, Youth and Sports as a private higher education institution on the basis of the accreditation of its study programs. Currently, six-degree programs at UNYP are accredited by the Czech Ministry of Education and Czech National Accreditation Bureau for Higher Education, and lead to a Bachelor's or master's degree awarded by UNYP:
 Business Administration (Bachelor's degree, 3-year program)
 Business Administration (Bachelor's degree, 4-year program)
 Communication & Media (Bachelor's degree, 4-year program)
 International Relations (Bachelor's degree, 4-year program)
 Psychology (Bachelor's degree, 4-year program)
 Psychology (Master's degree, 2-year program)

UNYP also has permission from the Czech Ministry of Education to offer degree programs from a number of foreign universities, leading to the awarding of Bachelor's or master's degrees from those universities. The foreign partner universities include:
 State University of New York, Empire State College, United States (International Relations, Business Administration, Psychology, Information Technology, English Language & Literature, Digital Media Arts, Political Science, Child Development)

Internationally, UNYP is accredited by the British Accreditation Council (BAC), and the university's business programs (MBA and 3-year Bachelor's program) are accredited by the US-based International Accreditation Council for Business Education (IACBE). In the Czech Republic, UNYP's MBA program has also been accredited by the Czech Association of MBA Schools since 2003. Several UNYP higher education programs are approved by the U.S. Department of Veterans Affairs for United States veterans and their eligible dependents to use their veterans benefits.

UNYP joined the American Chamber of Commerce in the Czech Republic in 1999, the Czech Association of MBA Schools (CAMBAS) in 2003, and the Canadian Chamber of Commerce in the Czech Republic in 2014. It is also a member of the Central and East European Management Development Association (CEEMAN), an association of business education providers in Central and Eastern Europe.

See also
List of universities in the Czech Republic

References

External links
University of New York in Prague website

Educational institutions established in 1998
Educational institutions in Prague
Universities in the Czech Republic
State University of New York
1998 establishments in the Czech Republic